Kenned David Sanga (born September 22, 1997), also known by his pseudonym "Director Kenny", Tanzanian music video director , cinematographer and film director from Dar es salaam, Tanzania.

Life and education
Kenny was born in Mbeya, Tanzania. He had his basic and higher education in Kambarage Mbeya, Tanzania , and later studied Electrical Engineering at the Moravian Vocational Training Center. He joined an production course in video shooting and directing in 2014.

Career
Director Kenny shot his first professional music video, for Tanzanian artist Lava Lava's song "DEDE", in 2017. He then directed the video for "Nishachoka" by Harmonize. Through his company, Zoom Production, Director Kenny has shot and released more than 50 videos of hip hop, RnB, reggae-dancehall, bongo flava, and afro-pop songs since 2018. He is noted for his innovative work on hugely popular music videos with artists such as Roki, Vanessa Mdee, Diamond Platnumz, Rayvanny, Mbosso, Zuchu, Harmonize and Tanasha Donna. Kenny directed the music video for Rayvanny's "Tetema", which was awarded "Best African Video" at the 2019 All Africa Music Awards.

Music videos

Awards

References

External links

Living people
1997 births
Cinematographers
Music video directors
Tanzanian film directors
People from Mbeya Region